Terrence Rafferty is a film critic who wrote regularly for The New Yorker during the 1990s. His writing has also appeared in Slate, The Atlantic Monthly, The Village Voice, The Nation, and The New York Times. For a number of years he served as critic at large for GQ. He has a particular penchant for horror fiction and has reviewed collections by Richard Matheson, Joe Hill, and the Spanish author Cristina Fernández Cubas.

Bibliography

Books 
 Unnatural Acts (1992)
 The Thing Happens: Ten Years of Writing About the Movies (1993)

Essays and reporting 
  Reviews Campbell Scott and Stanley Tucci's Big Night (1998).

———————
Notes

References

Year of birth missing (living people)
Living people
American film critics
The New Yorker critics
20th-century American non-fiction writers
21st-century American non-fiction writers
20th-century American male writers
American male non-fiction writers
21st-century American male writers